Expedition Robinson 1999, was the third edition of Expedition Robinson, or Survivor as it is referred to in some countries, to air in Sweden and it aired in 1999. The major twist this season was that the contestants were initially divided up into four tribes based on their gender. Like in the previous season, when a tribe lost immunity the other tribe would be allowed to vote one of the members of the losing tribe out. Also the joker twist was brought back for this edition. The 'joker' this season was Douglas Svedberg. The dominant alliance this season was that of the West team's Jerker, Jesus, Klas, and Robert, who all managed to make it to the final four. Eventually Jerker Dalman won the season with a jury vote of 5–4 over Klas Granström, who was initially the third person voted off the show, but was allowed to return after winning a challenge against Deniz following Susanna's ejection from the game.

Finishing order

Voting history

 As part of the twist this season, the tribe that won immunity voted someone out of the losing tribe.
 At the first tribal council both Deniz and Jenny received four votes. Because of this, both were forced to draw lots to determine who would be eliminated.
 Due to Susanna's ejection in episode 4, both Deniz and Klaus were offered an opportunity to re-enter the game through a duel.
 At the seventh, eighth, and tenth tribal councils black votes were cast.

References
Footnotes

Sources

External links
Expedition: Robinson i SVT 1997-2003

 1999
1999 Swedish television seasons